Romeril is a surname. Notable people with the surname include: 

 Alex Romeril (1893–1968), Canadian ice hockey player, football player, referee, and coach
 Herbert Romeril (1881–1963), English politician
 John Romeril (born 1945), Australian playwright